Waaq (also Waq or Waaqa) is the name for the sky God in the Cushitic languages of both the Oromo people and Somali people in the Horn of Africa. The word still means God in present Oromo language. Some traditions indicate Waaq is associated with the Harar region, however Waaqism also extends to eastern Kenyan Cushitic tribes, the Aweer people.

In Oromo and Somali culture, Waaq, Waaqa or Waaqo was the name of God in their pre-Christian and pre-Muslim monotheistic faith believed to have been adhered to by Cushitic groups. It was likely brought to the Horn by the speakers of the Proto-Cushitic language who arrived from North Sudan in the Neolithic. In modern times, the religion has mostly declined ever since the arrival of Islam and Christianity.    

This name for God was used mainly by Somali people and Oromo people before and after Christianity and Islam came to the Horn of Africa

There are also ancient names of villages which involve the word (WAAQ) in the Somali language and also Oromo language.

See also
 Somali mythology, including pre-Islamic culture
 Waaqeffanna, traditional Oromo religion

References

Further reading

 
 
 
 
 
 
 
 
 
 

African gods
Monotheism
Religion in Ethiopia
Religion in Kenya
Religion in Somalia